The 1890 Kentucky Derby was the 16th running of the Kentucky Derby. The race took place on May 14, 1890.

Full results

Payout
 The winner received a purse of $5,460.
 Second place received $300.
 Third place received $150.

References

1890
Kentucky Derby
Derby
May 1890 sports events
1890 in American sports